Geneviève Joy (4 October 1919 – 27 November 2009) was a French classical and modernist pianist who, at the end of World War II in 1945, formed a critically acclaimed duo-piano partnership with Jacqueline Robin which lasted for forty-five years, until 1990. The composer Henri Dutilleux, whom she married in 1946, dedicated his Piano Sonata to her, which she recorded for Erato Records in 1988.

A native of the small commune of Bernaville in the Somme department in Northern France region of Picardy, She was the daughter of Lina Breton from Bernaville and her Irish husband Charles Joy who served with the British Army during World War I. Geneviève Joy was a piano child prodigy who was accepted to the world-renowned Conservatoire de Paris in 1932 at the age of 12.

In 1982, she served on the jury of the Paloma O'Shea Santander International Piano Competition.

She died in her sleep at a Paris hospital eight weeks after her 90th birthday from cancer, and was subsequently buried in Montparnasse Cemetery. Her husband, Henri, was buried in the same grave in 2013.

References

External links
  of Gabriel Fauré's Dolly Suite, together with Jacqueline Robin.
 
 Genevieve Joy – Daily Telegraph obituary

1919 births
2009 deaths
People from Somme (department)
20th-century French women classical pianists
Classical piano duos
Conservatoire de Paris alumni
Academic staff of the École Normale de Musique de Paris
Burials at Montparnasse Cemetery
Women music educators
Erato Records artists